is a Japanese snowboarder who competes in the half-pipe event. He represented Japan at the 2002 Winter Olympics, where he placed 19th. He won the 2009–10 FIS Snowboard World Cup event in Kreischberg, Austria, his first career World Cup victory. He won the half-pipe event at the 2003 Asian Winter Games, the first time the event was contested.

References

External links
 
 

Japanese male snowboarders
Olympic snowboarders of Japan
Snowboarders at the 2002 Winter Olympics
Snowboarders at the 2010 Winter Olympics
1983 births
Sportspeople from Sapporo
Living people
Asian Games medalists in snowboarding
Snowboarders at the 2003 Asian Winter Games
Snowboarders at the 2007 Asian Winter Games
Asian Games gold medalists for Japan
Asian Games bronze medalists for Japan
Medalists at the 2003 Asian Winter Games
Medalists at the 2007 Asian Winter Games
Universiade medalists in snowboarding
Universiade gold medalists for Japan
Competitors at the 2003 Winter Universiade
21st-century Japanese people